CST8 can refer to:

 Montréal/Marina Venise Water Airport
 CST8 (gene)